Thomas Parker, 1st Earl of Macclesfield,  (23 July 1666 – 28 April 1732) was an English Whig politician who sat in the House of Commons from 1705 to 1710. He was Lord Chief Justice from 1710 to 1718 and acted briefly as one of the regents before the arrival of King George I in Britain. His career ended when he was convicted of corruption on a massive scale and he spent the later years of his life in retirement at his home, Shirburn Castle in Oxfordshire.

Early life
Parker was born in Staffordshire, the son of Thomas Parker, an attorney at Leek and his wife Anne, daughter of Robert Venables of Nuneham, Cheshire. Sir Richard Levinge, 1st Baronet, a leading figure in Irish public life for three decades, was his first cousin. He was educated at Adams' Grammar School at Newport, Shropshire, Derby School in 1680 and at Rev. Samuel Ogden's school at Derby. He was admitted at Inner Temple in 1684 and at Trinity College, Cambridge as a pensioner in 1685. On 23 April 1691, he married Janet Carrier, whose sister was the wife of William Anson and mother of the future Admiral Lord Anson. He was called to the bar in 1694. Together they had two children:

Lady Elizabeth Parker (d. 21 Feb 1747) married Sir William Heathcote, 1st Baronet. They had six sons and three daughters.
George Parker, 2nd Earl of Macclesfield (circa 1697 - 17 Mar 1764)

Political career
Parker was returned as Whig Member of Parliament for Derby at the 1705 English general election and was appointed QC and serjeant-at-law and knighted on 9 July 1705. He was returned unopposed for Derby at the 1708 British general election. Like other Whigs, he voted for the general naturalization of foreign Protestants in 1709. Being one of the leading Whig lawyers in the House of Commons, he was deeply involved in the moves to impeach Dr Sacheverell. He was appointed to the committee to draw up the articles of impeachment on 14 December 1709. The committee was later given the management of the trial. In 1710 he refused the office of Lord High Chancellor of Great Britain, but was made a Privy Counsellor. The office of Lord Chief Justice fell vacant in 1710 and the administration wanted a quick replacement. Parker was appointed on 11 March 1710 and vacated his seat in the House of Commons.

Lord Chief Justice

From 1710 to 1718 Parker was involved in the prosecution of Dr Sacheverell. He made a vehement attack on Sacheverell and the high church clergy. He defended Whig propagandists and harried Tory publicists, including Defoe and Swift, on the slightest suspicion of favouring the Pretender. He spoke against the peace in the Privy Council in April 1713. In June 1714 he was given evidence of the recruiting activity of Jacobite agents which resulted in a price being placed on the Pretender's head. On 1 August 1714, Queen Anne died, and her successor, King George I, was in Hanover, so Baron Parker was designated as one of the regents of Great Britain, Ireland and the realms beyond the seas until the new monarch arrived in Britain. His support for the Hanoverian succession was appreciated by King George I who reappointed him lord chief justice in 1714, and raised him to the peerage as Baron Parker of Macclesfield in 1716, in which year he purchased, and then commenced to restore, Shirburn Castle in Oxfordshire, which was to be the seat of the house of Macclesfield for the next 300 years. In 1718, because the King could not speak English, Parker read the King's Speech in the House of Lords.

Lord Chancellor
In 1718, Parker became Lord Chancellor, and was given a pension for life. In 1721, he was advanced to the title Earl of Macclesfield with the additional subsidiary title of Viscount Parker.

Impeachment
In 1724, Parker was implicated in financial irregularities, but he did not resign as Lord High Chancellor of Great Britain until 1725. In 1725, he was impeached and tried in the House of Lords. He was, unanimously, convicted of corruption for taking more than £100,000 in bribes (the equivalent of more than £11,000,000 today). He was fined £30,000 and placed in the Tower of London until payment was received. He was also struck off the roll of the Privy Council. He was a fabulously wealthy man, possibly because of his corruption, but as this money was confiscated, he had no resources to pay a fine. He spent most of the rest of his life at Shirburn Castle. He died in Soho Square, London on 28 April 1732 and was buried at Shirburn.

Parker was elected a Fellow of the Royal Society in 1713. He was a friend of Bernard de Mandeville, whose satirical Fable of the Bees became highly controversial in the 1720s. He was patron of a grammar school built at Leek, his home town. In 1727, he was a pallbearer at the funeral of another friend, Sir Isaac Newton.

References

External links
 Manuscript reference
 'everything' on-line reference
 document relating to his impeachment.
 How Much Is That Worth Today?

|-

1666 births
1732 deaths
Alumni of Trinity College, Cambridge
British MPs 1707–1708
British MPs 1708–1710
Earls in the Peerage of Great Britain
Fellows of the Royal Society
Lord chancellors of Great Britain
Lord chief justices of England and Wales
Parker, Thomas
Parker, Thomas
Members of the Privy Council of Great Britain
People from Leek, Staffordshire
British politicians convicted of corruption
People educated at Adams' Grammar School
People expelled from the Privy Council of Great Britain
Regents
Thomas
Parker, Thomas
Politicians from Staffordshire
Earls of Macclesfield
Impeached British officials